Vigia is a low mountain in the northwestern part of the island of Boa Vista, Cape Verde. Its elevation is 146 m. It is situated 4 km north of the island capital Sal Rei, and 2 km south of the headland Ponta do Sol. It is part of the Ponta do Sol Nature Reserve covering 467 hectares of land and sea.

See also
 List of mountains in Cape Verde

References

Mountains of Cape Verde
Geography of Boa Vista, Cape Verde
Stratovolcanoes